Kamananga is a village in South Kivu, Democratic Republic of the Congo. It was the site of a massacre on 13 May 2012 in which thirty-two people were killed.

References

Populated places in South Kivu